Richard Middleton Freeland (born May 13, 1941, in Orange, New Jersey) was president of Northeastern University from 1996 to 2006 and served as the Commissioner of Higher Education for Massachusetts from 2008 until 2015.

Freeland grew up in Mountain Lakes, New Jersey, and was a 1959 graduate of Mountain Lakes High School; he was inducted into the school's hall of fame in 2014. He was granted a bachelor's degree in American Studies from Amherst College and a doctorate in American Civilization from the University of Pennsylvania.

Freeland is married to Elsa Nunez, and has two children. Freeland's maternal grandmother Georgie Boynton Child was the author of The Efficient Kitchen:  Definite Directions for the Planning, Arranging, and Equipping of the Modern Labor Saving Kitchen; A Practical Book for the Homemaker (1914)

During Freeland's tenure, Northeastern University went through major institutional changes, including becoming a more selective institution, moving to semesters from quarters, and the opening of over $400 million worth of new facilities.

Educational positions 
 Clark University – Worcester (2007–2009)
 Mosakowski Professor of Higher Education 
 University of Massachusetts Boston (1970–1992)
 Assistant to the president
 Assistant to the chancellor
 Director of the Office of Educational Planning
 Dean of the College of Arts and Sciences
 City University of New York (1992–1996)
 Vice chancellor for academic affairs
 Northeastern University
 President (1996–2006)
Commonwealth of Massachusetts, Department of Higher Education
Commissioner of Higher Education (2008–2015)

Other positions
 Vice-chair, board of trustees for the Boston Plan for Excellence
 Director, American Council on Education
 Director, Boston Museum Project
 Director, Boston Private Industry Council
 Director, Globe Newspaper Corporation
 Director, Jobs for Massachusetts
 Governing board member, John Adams Innovation Institute
 Member of the board of trustees, WGBH
 President, board of governors in the World Association of Cooperative Education

Books 
The Truman Doctrine and the Origins of McCarthyism (1972)
Academia's Golden Age (1992)

References

1941 births
Living people
Amherst College alumni
Clark University faculty
Mountain Lakes High School alumni
People from Mountain Lakes, New Jersey
People from Orange, New Jersey
University of Massachusetts Boston faculty
University of Pennsylvania alumni
Presidents of Northeastern University